Liagore is a genus of crabs in the family Xanthidae, native to Australia, containing the following species:

 Liagore erythematica Guinot, 1971
 Liagore pulchella Ng & Naruse, 2007
 Liagore rubromaculata (De Haan, 1835)

References

Xanthoidea